The December 2013 North American storm complex was a significant storm complex that included many different types of severe weather, including a winter storm, a crippling ice storm and a tornado outbreak that impacted the central and eastern portions of Canada, parts of the Central Great Plains, the Southern United States, and the northeastern United States from 20 to 23 December 2013. Formed in the South Central United States, the storm headed across the Great Plains towards Canada into Atlantic Canada and northeastern United States where the storm dissipated on 23 December 2013. The storm produced freezing rain and snow to the affected areas which caused massive damage to electric power transmission and trees. The storm resulted in 29 deaths, loss of power to over a million residents and over $200 million in damages. The storm produced similar conditions to the ice storm of 1998 which affected similar areas.

Meteorological history 

On 19 December, an area of low pressure that had formed over Texas traveled through the northwestern part of Arkansas, passing through Oklahoma overnight on 19 December, heading towards the Midwestern United States and the Great Plains where lower temperatures forecast ice accumulation. It entered Ontario, Canada, by 2:00 pm on 20 December, when a freezing rain warning was in place. The associated warm front, which ran from Texas, met a cold air mass in eastern Canada, where large amounts of snow fell. Near the front, precipitation was in the form of freezing rain and ice pellets. The front gradually extended toward Atlantic Canada during the night of 20–21 December, affecting extreme Southern Quebec and later the Maritimes. By mid-day on 21 December, an upper-level low had developed in central Texas, and this began to draw moisture from the Gulf of Mexico. While moving to the northeast, the storm dumped heavy snow and ice over parts of the Upper Midwest and Michigan Peninsula through 21 December.

On 22 December, the storm brought freezing rain to the state of Maine. The storm caused freezing rain to accumulate on tree branches, causing some to fall off and topple power lines. The storm complex continued to produce ice and snow in the northern parts of New England and Canada, before finally weakening and dissipating late on 23 December.

The storm complex was also responsible for producing a small but damaging tornado outbreak that occurred from 20–21 December, most of which occurred on 21 December, due to the fact that supercell thunderstorms were able to pop up, and eventually coalesced into a squall line later the same day along the system's cold front, as it tracked towards the East Coast. It then began to linger over the Southeast before weakening as the initial area of low pressure tracked out of the country.

Confirmed tornadoes

December 20 event

December 21 event

Preparations 

Before the storm, meteorologists predicted falls of a mixture of snow, ice pellets and freezing rain from two storm systems from Texas and the Great Lakes.  As the predicted possible ice storm was heading towards the northeastern United States, utility workers were preparing for the event. Governor of New York Andrew Cuomo declared a winter ice storm emergency for parts of the state and  prepared the emergency operations center. In Toronto, Toronto Hydro executive vice president Ben LaPianta stated, "We knew the storm was coming out of the central U.S., it was a warm air mass and we knew that it was going to collide somewhere in Ontario." Utility workers prepared for the possibility of fallen power lines and officials warned residents to prepare for power outages.

Impacts 
In both central Canada and central United States, cryoseisms (frost quakes) formed as a result of this ice storm were heard by a large number of people.

Canada

Ontario 

Hydro One, an electricity company that serves mostly rural areas of Ontario, reported over 600,000 power outages at the height of the storm. The worst-hit areas were along the shores of the Lake Ontario. In Trenton, just east of the Greater Toronto Area (GTA), there was a reported  of ice accumulation on the ground. The ice accumulation across southern and eastern Ontario was severe enough to cause widespread power outages because of fallen trees and branches. There were numerous automobile accidents on Highway 401. The town of Woolwich declared a state of emergency on 22 December after it was determined it would be without power for at least 24 hours.  Elsewhere in Ontario, thousands of customers remained without power until well after Christmas Day.

Toronto, Canada's largest city, was one of the hardest hit by the ice storm. The first wave of freezing rain began on 20 December; it coated the city in a significant but manageable quantity of ice. The second, more powerful wave of rain struck the city in the early morning of 22 December. Utility poles and tree branches collapsed under the weight of the thick ice accumulation. At the height of the storm over 300,000 Toronto Hydro customers had no electricity or heating. The City of Toronto simultaneously opened and operated 13 community reception centers and 13 Toronto police facility community warming centers, providing temporary sleeping accommodation, food, water, hygiene kits and other resources. The warming centers operated 24 hours a day, offering those without electricity a warm place to sleep and eat until their power was restored. By 24 December, four days after the storm, 69,800 customers throughout the city were still without electricity. Approximately 1,000 people spent Christmas Eve in the warming centers. On 29 December, Hydro One diverted its crews to assist Toronto Hydro to help restore power to over 6,000 people in the city who were still without power. In addition to Hydro One, crews were called in from Ottawa, Windsor and Michigan and Manitoba to help restore power to the city by the New Year. West of Toronto, crews were called in from Goderich, Niagara Region, Tillsonburg, St. Thomas, Essex, Guelph, Haldimand County and Oakville.

In Ottawa, temperatures were low enough to spare the nation's capital the worst of the freezing rain. Slippery conditions on Ottawa's roads resulted in public transit delays of up to 30 minutes. There were also numerous VIA Rail delays on services between Ottawa and Toronto. In some cases, trains were delayed for over two hours because of the accumulation of snow and ice on the tracks. Additional delays were caused by fallen trees obstructing the railway. Approximately 6,000 customers in Ottawa lost electricity supplies at the height of the storm; however, unlike areas to the south, the power outages in Ottawa lasted only a few hours.

On 30 December, Loblaws, Shoppers Drug Mart, Sobeys and Metro donated  in grocery and gift cards, Coppas Fresh Market donated  in grocery cards, and the Ontario Government donated . Residents of Toronto who could not afford to replace food spoiled by the blackout could pick up the cards at Ontario Works offices from 31 December 2013 to 3 January 2014.

On 22 December 2013, the Toronto Transit Commission suspended streetcar services for most of the day because of thick ice on the overhead wires. The Sheppard line also ceased operations until 24 December. On the Yonge–University–Spadina line, trains bypassed North York Centre station because there was no electricity. The entire Scarborough RT line was shut down until 23 December because of the freezing rain. Along the Bloor-Danforth line, shuttle buses ran from Victoria Park to Warden, Kennedy stations and beyond to those on the Scarborough RT line.

Quebec 
It caused six deaths, but none related to the freezing precipitation. More than 50,000 power outages were caused by the accumulation of ice. Hydro-Québec sent more than 500 technicians to help restore power supplies.

Atlantic Canada 
The storm system moved eastwards from Ontario towards the Atlantic provinces, creating delays at major airports in Nova Scotia, Newfoundland and New Brunswick. 53,000 residents in New Brunswick and 12,000 residents in Nova Scotia were without electricity. These provinces were under a freezing rain warning.

United States 

Parts of the United States, including the northeastern United States, New York and Michigan were affected by the storm. Red Cross shelters were set up to assist people affected by it. On 21 December 500 flights were delayed in major hub airports across the country. In the midwest several floods were reported following the storm. On 22 December, the storm also brought record warm temperatures to New York City and the tri state area.

In the state of Maine, more than 123,000 homes lost power. Central Maine Power (CMP), Maine's largest electricity supplier, brought in 900 line crews to supplement the CMP's 85 line crews to restore supplies. In Michigan, approximately 380,700 homes and businesses across the state were without electricity. Many of the outages were reported in Ingham, Genesee, and Lapeer counties. Consumers Energy stated, "this storm was the largest Christmas-week storm in the company's 126-year history and the worst ice storm in 10 years".

Both Vermont and New York issued states of emergency. In Jefferson County, New York, officials declared a state of emergency after significant damage affected the area. An emergency operations center was set up to monitor the storm damage. In upstate New York, more than 70,000 customers were without electricity; 17,000 National Grid plc customers reported outages. Ice storm preparation was in force in New Hampshire, where utility crews staged vehicles before the storm arrived.

In the state of Maine, hydro service provider Central Maine Power started power recovery efforts to 123,000 customers. On 25 December, 1,800 workers cleared broken branches and fallen trees to restore electricity supplies. On 3 April 2014, the Federal Emergency Management Agency declined a request from governor Paul LePage, in funding disaster support to Maine. In Michigan, the Michigan Department of Environmental Quality allocated an emergency order to allow several counties to send debris from fallen trees to local landfill sites.

Central United States 
In Arkansas, several power lines fell. Heavy ice damaged trees around Ouachita National Forest and Ozark–St. Francis National Forest, in which some collapsed, causing road closures in the area. In the city of Redfield, Arkansas, a tornado damaged property. In the Missouri city of Springfield, more than 800 residents reported power outages. Utility crews from City Water, Light & Power initiated power recovery efforts. Isolated power outages occurred, multiple trees and tree limbs were broken or pulled down by the weight of the ice.

Deaths 
It was reported that 27 deaths were related to the storm.

Canada

Ontario 

Following the ice storm, thousands of tree branches littered the streets and sidewalks of Toronto. Some roads had to be closed because they were blocked by large tree limbs. More commonly, tree branches made walking on sidewalks difficult; pedestrians were either forced to navigate through the debris or walk onto busy roads to avoid the large branches. Further snow accumulations a few days after the storm resulted in more broken branches and power lines. The city of Toronto announced that debris clearing operations would begin on 3 January 2014. The operation was expected to take about eight weeks to complete. Clearing streets and sidewalks was prioritized, before attention was shifted to cleaning debris from city parks on 23 January. Residents were told that while the city would pick up debris that fell on private property, homeowners were responsible for ensuring the material was piled at the end of their driveways for municipal employees to collect. However, the city announced it would not take responsibility for large tree limbs that had fallen on private property. Residents were told they would have to hire private contractors to remove the material.

Toronto Hydro reported an estimated cost of  due to the ice storm, including around $1 million of lost revenue, $10 million spent on labor, and $2 million in materials. CEO Anthony Haines reported that the cost might be passed on to customers in increased electricity charges. Haines told critics who argued that Toronto's power distribution system should be moved underground that the project would cost . He said this would cause a price hike of about 300 per cent because underground systems cost about seven times as much as overhead systems. He also said underground systems may not solve all the problems associated with weather-related power outages.

It was estimated that damage to the city of Brampton cost $51 million; in Mississauga it was $25 million . Several Manitoba Hydro utility workers assisted in the recovery efforts.

Quebec 
In Quebec on 22 December, Hydro-Quebec reported 9,500 clients were affected by power outages from the storm. Five days later, 4,000 were without power, most of whom were in the Eastern Townships of Quebec. By 29 December, the reports had decreased to below 400.

Atlantic Canada 
Following the ice storm, it was reported that half of the residents of Saint John, New Brunswick were without power. NB Power reported that recovery efforts were underway but would be slow. On 27 December, NB Power restored electricity to 13,000 customers. 3,200 NB Power customers were still without power on 29 December. In Nova Scotia, crews responded to the outages. 2,000 reports were completed by 24 December.

See also

2013–14 North American winter
Early 2014 North American cold wave
January 1998 North American ice storm
Late December 2012 North American storm complex
December 2015 North American storm complex
November 2015 United States ice storm
Mid-January 2017 North American ice storm

Notes

References 

2013–14 North American winter
2013 disasters in Canada
2013 natural disasters in the United States
2013 meteorology
2013 natural disasters
Ice storm 2013
2013
December 2013 events in Canada
December 2013 events in the United States
Tornadoes of 2013
Natural disasters in Mississippi
Natural disasters in Oklahoma
Natural disasters in Ontario
Natural disasters in Quebec